Spain competed at the 2018 European Athletics Championships in Berlin, Germany, between 7 and 12 August 2018. This event was part of the 2018 European Championships

Medals

Results
Men
Track & road events

Field events

Combined events – Decathlon

Women
Track & road events

Field events

Combined events – Heptathlon

See also
Spain at the 2018 European Championships

References

External links
Spanish Team as announced by RFEA
Spanish Federation selection criteria (in Spanish)

European Athletics Championships
2018
Nations at the 2018 European Athletics Championships